The 50th Rifle Corps was a corps of the Soviet Red Army. It was part of the 23rd Army on 22 June 1941. It took part in the Great Patriotic War.

Organization 
On 22 June 1941, the corps included the following units:

 43rd Rifle Division
 70th Rifle Division
 123rd Rifle Division

Commanders 
 Komkor Filipp Gorelenko (08.1939 - 05.1940)
 Komkor Panteleimon Zaitsev (05.1940 - 08.1940)
 Major General Vladimir Shcherbakov (17.01.1941 - 04.08.1941)
 Major General Sarkis Martirosyan (25.06.1943 - 24.04.1944)

 Major General Pavel Batitsky (25.04.1944 - 27.05.1944)
 Major General Serafim Merkulov (28.05.1944 - 20.04.1945)
 Major General Nikolai Tavartkiladze (21.04.1945 - 11.05.1945)

References

Citations

Bibliography 

 

Rifle corps of the Soviet Union